Blipverts may refer to:
"Blipverts" (Max Headroom), the pilot episode of the Max Headroom science fiction genre 1987–1988 TV series
 Blipvert, a fictional high-intensity television commercial technology first discussed in the "Blipverts" pilot of Max Headroom

Max Headroom